Colin Stetson (born March 3, 1975)  is a Canadian-American saxophonist, multireedist, and composer based in Montreal. He is best known as a regular collaborator of the indie rock acts Arcade Fire, Bon Iver, Bell Orchestre, and Ex Eye. In addition to saxophone, he plays clarinet, bass clarinet, French horn, flute, and cornet.

Stetson has released various solo releases, including his debut and subsequent albums New History Warfare Vol. 1, 2, & 3, a collaborative studio album with violinist Sarah Neufeld entitled Never Were the Way She Was (2015), SORROW: A Reimagining of Henryk Górecki's 3rd Symphony (2016), and All This I Do for Glory (2017). Since 2013, Stetson has contributed the scores to several films and television series.

Background
Born in Ann Arbor, Michigan and currently based in Montreal, Quebec Stetson started taking lessons at age 15. He attended the University of Michigan School of Music with a full scholarship, where he joined Transmission Trio. He also played with the groups Boostamonte and the People's Bizarre.

Stetson has performed and recorded with dozens of artists, including Tom Waits, Arcade Fire, TV on the Radio, Feist, Bon Iver, Laurie Anderson, Lou Reed, Sinéad O'Connor, The National, Godspeed You! Black Emperor, BadBadNotGood, Fink, Animal Collective, LCD Soundsystem, Hamid Drake, David Byrne, Bill Laswell, Evan Parker, Jolie Holland, The Chemical Brothers, Shahzad Ismaily, My Brightest Diamond, Angélique Kidjo, Kevin Devine, David Gilmour, Anthony Braxton, and Beanie Burnett.

His extended saxophone techniques cover advanced circular breathing, multiphonics, altissimo, microtones, (reed) vocalizations, percussive valve-work, clicking keys, and growling. The overall effect led The New Yorker film critic Anthony Lane to describe Stetson's score to the film Hereditary as having been seemingly "scored for violins, percussion, a humpback whale, and bats."

Solo career

His first solo album, New History Warfare, Vol. 1, was released in 2008. His second and third albums, New History Warfare Vol. 2: Judges and New History Warfare Vol. 3: To See More Light, were released by Constellation Records in early 2011. On June 16, the album was named as a longlisted nominee (one of 40) for the 2011 Polaris Music Prize. On July 6, the album was named as a shortlisted (one of 10) nominee for the 2011 award. Stetson was chosen by Jeff Mangum of Neutral Milk Hotel to perform at the All Tomorrow's Parties festival that he curated in December 2011 in Minehead, England. The final album of the trilogy, New History Warfare Vol. 3: To See More Light, was released by Constellation Records in April 2013, and was a longlist nominee for the 2013 Polaris Music Prize.

April 2015 saw the release of Never Were the Way She Was, the first recording of Stetson's duo project with his wife and long-time collaborator Sarah Neufeld.

Stetson's album All This I Do for Glory was released on April 28, 2017.

While his recordings have been featured in numerous films and TV episodes, he has also produced original scores for a wide variety of films, where he has utilized a rich amalgam of his signature sonic characteristics, enhanced by various arrangement and instrumentation, orchestral and otherwise.

Discography

Solo albums/As leader
Tiny Beast (2003) with Transmission Trio
Slow Descent (2003)
New History Warfare Vol. 1 (2007)
The Righteous Wrath of an Honorable Man 7" (2010)
New History Warfare Vol. 2: Judges (2011)
Those Who Didn't Run EP (2011)
New History Warfare Vol. 3: To See More Light (2013)
SORROW: A Reimagining of Gorecki's 3rd Symphony (2016)
All This I Do for Glory (2017)
Chim​æ​ra I (2022)

Soundtrack albums 

 Blue Caprice (2013)
 La Peur (2015)
 Outlaws and Angels (2016)
 Hereditary (2018)
 The First (2018)
 Color Out of Space (2020)
 Barkskins (2020)
 Deliver Us (2020)
 The War Show (2020)
 Mayday (2021)
 Texas Chainsaw Massacre (2022)
 Among the Stars (2022)
 The Menu (Original Motion Picture Soundtrack) (2022)

Collaborations with other artists
Gringo Blaster (2002) with Michael Kowalski
Stones (2012) with Mats Gustafsson
Never Were the Way She Was (2015) with Sarah Neufeld
Ex Eye (2017) with Ex Eye (Greg Fox, Shahzad Ismaily, Toby Summerfield)
 Radiate (2015) with Chemical Brothers
 The Long Road North (2022) with Cult of Luna

As sideman

With Tom Waits
Blood Money (2002)
Alice (2002)
Orphans: Brawlers, Bawlers & Bastards (2006)

With Arcade Fire
Neon Bible (2007)
The Suburbs (2010)
Reflektor (2013)

With TV on the Radio
Dear Science (2008)

With Jolie Holland
The Living and the Dead (2008)

With Feist
Metals (2011)

With Esmerine
La Lechuza (2011)

With Timber Timbre
Creep on Creepin' On (2011)
Hot Dreams (2014)

With Bon Iver
Bon Iver, Bon Iver (2011)
22, A Million (2016)

With David Gilmour
Rattle That Lock (2015)

With BadBadNotGood
IV (2016)

With Animal Collective
Painting With (2016)

With Sarah Neufeld
The Ridge (2016)

With Marcus Hamblett
Detritus (2019)

Filmography

Films

Documentaries

Television

Video games

References

External links

 Colin Stetson website
 Official Bon Iver website
 Embedded In The Skull: Colin Stetson's Favourite LPs - The Quietus (March 2017)

American expatriates in Canada
American saxophonists
American male saxophonists
Arcade Fire members
Bon Iver members
Constellation Records (Canada) artists
Juno Award for Instrumental Album of the Year winners
Living people
Musicians from Ann Arbor, Michigan
University of Michigan School of Music, Theatre & Dance alumni
1975 births
21st-century saxophonists
Grammy Award winners